Mount Gray is a rounded, ice-worn mountain on the southwest part of the McDonald Heights in coastal Marie Byrd Land, Antarctica. The mountain was discovered on aerial flights from the West Base of the United States Antarctic Service in 1940, and named for Orville Gray, an aviation machinist's mate, and plane captain on these flights.

References

Mountains of Marie Byrd Land